Miles Alexander Sherrill House is a historic home located near Sherrills Ford, Catawba County, North Carolina. It was built in 1886, and is a two-story, frame Stick style dwelling. It features irregular massing, steeply pitched gable and shed roofs, and German siding with an overlay of vertical and horizontal boards.

It was listed on the National Register of Historic Places in 1990.

References

Houses on the National Register of Historic Places in North Carolina
Houses completed in 1886
Queen Anne architecture in North Carolina
Houses in Catawba County, North Carolina
National Register of Historic Places in Catawba County, North Carolina